Seabraia is a genus of beetles in the family Cerambycidae, containing the following species:

 Seabraia sanguinicollis Zajciw, 1958
 Seabraia zajciwi Lane, 1965

References

Trachyderini
Cerambycidae genera